Feliceni (meaning "Upper Village of the Blessed", referring to the Virgin Mary) is a commune in Harghita County, Romania, in the vicinity of Odorheiu Secuiesc. It forms part of the Székely Land, an ethno-cultural region in eastern Transylvania.

Component villages 
The commune is composed of eleven villages:

History 

The villages of the commune historically belonged to the Székely seat of Udvarhelyszék and from 1876 to Udvarhely County in the Kingdom of Hungary. In the immediate aftermath of World War I, during the Hungarian–Romanian War (1918–1919), these localities passed under Romanian administration. By the terms of the Treaty of Trianon of 1920, they became part of the Kingdom of Romania.

As a result of the Second Vienna Award of August 1940, the region became part of Hungary until the Romanian Army and the Red Army entered the area in September–October 1944. After the Soviet occupation it came again under Romanian administration in March 1945, and became part of Romania in 1947. Between 1952 and 1960, the villages formed part of the Hungarian Autonomous Province, then, of the Mureș-Hungarian Autonomous Province until it was abolished in 1968. Since then, the commune has been part of Harghita County.

Demographics

At the 2011 census, the commune had a population of 3,297; out of them, 97% were Hungarian, 0.9% were Romanian, and 0.7% were Roma.

Polonița
Polonița (or colloquially Lengyelfalva, meaning "Poles' village") is located along the Polonița (Lengyelfalvi) Creek  in a narrow valley. It had 319 inhabitants in 2002 (down from 503 in 1910), of whom 315 were Hungarians.

The village was first mentioned in 1505 as Lengenfalwa when a certain Balthasar was elected "seat judge" at Udvarhely. In 1533, the name was recorded as Lengyelfalva. In 1899, the ethnonym Székely was added to the Hungarian placename in order to distinguish the locality from another Lengyelfalva (now: Košická Polianka) of the historical Kingdom of Hungary. The Romanian name derives from the Hungarian one and was originally used as Lenghelfalău which was later Romanianized by translation.

Its Roman Catholic church was built in 1802 replacing the medieval church.

Natives
Balázs Orbán (1829–1890)

References

External links 
 

Communes in Harghita County
Localities in Transylvania
Székely communities